Temalisi Fakahokotau (born 9 September 1994) is a New Zealand netball player of Tongan descent. She first played for the national team in 2014.

Early life
Fakahokotau was born in New Zealand of Tongan parents on 9 September 1994. She is one of nine siblings, and has seven brothers and one sister. She attended Westlake Girls High School in Auckland, where she was Sportswoman of the Year in 2012. She was named in the New Zealand Secondary Schools Squad and represented the Northern Zone in Under-23 competition. In 2014 she joined the Northern Mystics team to compete in the ANZ Premiership. She made her New Zealand debut in the 2014 Constellation Cup against Australia.

Professional career
In 2017 she joined the Mainland Tactix, a team based in Christchurch on New Zealand's South Island. In 2018 she was the Team Player of the Year for the Tactix and led the ANZ Premiership in all defensive statistics, but in September of that year she suffered an anterior cruciate ligament injury, which meant that she was unable to play for New Zealand in the 2019 World Cup. She joined Waikato Bay of Plenty Magic in 2020, wishing to return to the north to be near her family. At the end of 2021 she signed for the Central Pulse team, but not long after stepped down from the Pulse for the 2022 season, highlighting family priorities.  Fakahokotau made  a surprise move by joining the Saracens Mavericks for the remainder of the United Kingdom's 2022 Netball Superleague season.

References

 

1994 births
Living people
New Zealand international netball players
New Zealand sportspeople of Tongan descent
People educated at Westlake Girls High School
Northern Mystics players
Mainland Tactix players
Waikato Bay of Plenty Magic players
Central Pulse players
Netball players from Auckland
Mavericks netball players
New Zealand expatriate netball people in England
Netball Superleague players
New Zealand international Fast5 players